Adolf Eybel (1808–1882) was a German painter of historical and genre subjects and of portraits. He was born in Berlin. He studied at the Berlin Academy, and under Professor Kolbe, as well as in Paris under Delaroche. One of his most noted pictures represents Richard Coeur-de-Lion with his Court listening to Blondel's Song. He died in Berlin in 1882. The following works by him may also be mentioned:

A Gleaner.
The Battle of Fehrbellin.
Scene from Sir Walter Scott's Woodstock.
Scene from Faust.
A Wine Party.

See also
 List of German painters

References

 

1808 births
1882 deaths
19th-century German painters
German male painters
Artists from Berlin
Prussian Academy of Arts alumni
19th-century German male artists